Howard Edward "Red" Maley (December 6, 1921 – June 20, 1987), was an American football back and punter in the National Football League (NFL). Drafted in 1944, Maley played for two seasons from 1946 to 1947 for the Boston Yanks. Maley played college football at Texas–Arlington and Southern Methodist University.

Early years
While growing up in Dallas, Maley played football during his time at Woodrow Wilson High School. His high school football coach, Wade Thompson, described Maley as "a quiet boy."

College career
Maley played for the Texas–Arlington Mavericks before later playing for the SMU Mustangs in 1941 and 1942. During his time with the Mustangs, Maley was described by the Chicago Tribune as a "brilliant [...] triple threat." On being a triple threat, he was noted for his passing, running, and punting. As a sophomore, Maley sustained a "torn knee cartilage" during the 1941 season.

His college career was interrupted by World War II, during which he spent time in the Marine Corps. While he was serving in the Marine Corps, he was drafted by the NFL's Brooklyn Dodgers, who would play as the Tigers during the season he was drafted. He later returned to SMU and during his senior year, he was the leading punter in college football. Wade Thompson stated, "I don't think SMU ever got all out of him that he had to give."

NFL career
Maley was drafted in the 17th round of the 1944 NFL Draft by the Brooklyn Dodgers, who would play as the Brooklyn Tigers for the 1944 season. Due to financial issues, the Tigers would then merge with the Boston Yanks for the 1945 season.

The Yanks would utilize Maley in 1946 and 1947, primarily as a punter. Maley did, however, also register statistics in passing, rushing, receiving, punt returning, as well as kick returning. Maley threw for 2 touchdowns and 3 interceptions in his career. In 1947, Maley led the league in punting yards, with 3,731. At the time, it was the most punting yards recorded in a single NFL season, until Pat Brady surpassed the mark in 1953.

NFL.com lists Maley as a quarterback.

Career statistics

Punting

|-
| style="text-align:center;"| 1946
| style="text-align:center;"| Boston
| 11 || 60 || 2,373 || 39.6 || N/A || 61 || style="background:#cfecec;"| 1
|-
| style="text-align:center;"| 1947
| style="text-align:center;"| Boston
| 12 || style="background:#cfecec;"| 92 || style="background:#cfecec;"| 3,731 || 40.6 || N/A || 66 || style="background:#cfecec;"| 3
|-
|- class="sortbottom" style="background:#eee;"
|style="text-align:center;" colspan="2"|Career
| 23 || 152 || 6,104 || 40.2 || N/A || 66 || 4
|}

References

1921 births
1987 deaths
American football halfbacks
American football punters
American football quarterbacks
American football running backs
United States Marine Corps personnel of World War II
Boston Yanks players
Players of American football from Dallas
SMU Mustangs football players
Texas–Arlington Mavericks football players